Concremiers is a commune in the Indre department in central France.

Geography
The commune is located in the parc naturel régional de la Brenne.

The Salleron forms part of the commune's western border, then flows into the Anglin. The village lies in the middle of the commune, on the right bank of the Anglin, which flows west through the commune.

Population

See also
Communes of the Indre department

References

Communes of Indre